The 1984 WCT World Doubles, also known by its sponsored name Barratt World Doubles Championship, was a men's tennis tournament played on indoor carpet courts at Royal Albert Hall in London, England that was part of the 1984 World Championship Tennis circuit. It was the tour finals for the doubles season of the WCT Tour section. The tournament was held from January 3 through January 8, 1984.

Final

Doubles

 Pavel Složil /  Tomáš Šmíd defeated  Anders Järryd /  Hans Simonsson 1–6, 6–3, 3–6, 6–4, 6–3

References

World Championship Tennis World Doubles
1984 World Championship Tennis circuit